Paradoxica is a genus of moths of the family Erebidae by Michael Fibiger in 2011.

Species
Paradoxica parki Fibiger, 2011
Paradoxica asymmetrica Fibiger, 2011
Paradoxica proxima Fibiger, 2011

References

Micronoctuini
Noctuoidea genera